Prays liophaea is a moth in the  family Plutellidae.

External links
 Prays liophaea at www.catalogueoflife.org.

Plutellidae
Moths of Africa
Moths described in 1927